Bae Jong-ok (born May 13, 1964) is a South Korean actress. She debuted as a TV actress after she was recruited by KBS, and has since been active in both film and television.

While concurrently maintaining an acting career, Bae completed a doctorate at Korea University. Her thesis was on the correlation between production crews and reactions of netizens. She has taught Theater and Film Studies at Chung-Ang University as a visiting professor since 2003.

Personal life
Bae married a pilot in 1994, but the couple divorced in 1996. She has a daughter studying in the United States.

Bae adheres to a pescatarian diet.

Filmography

Film
*Note: the whole list is referenced.

Television series

Variety show

Theater

Awards and nominations

References

External links
 
 
 
 Bae Jong-ok Fan Cafe at Daum 

1964 births
Actresses from Seoul
South Korean television actresses
South Korean film actresses
South Korean stage actresses
Living people
Chung-Ang University alumni
Korea University alumni
20th-century South Korean actresses
21st-century South Korean actresses
Best Actress Paeksang Arts Award (film) winners